Arik Dasan Gilbert (born February 22, 2002) is an American football tight end for the Nebraska Cornhuskers. He has also played for both the LSU Tigers and Georgia Bulldogs.

High school career
Gilbert attended Marietta High School in Marietta, Georgia. As a senior, he was the Gatorade Football Player of the Year after he caught 101 passes for 1,760 yards and 14 touchdowns. For his career he had 243 receptions for 3,540 yards and 35 touchdowns. A five-star recruit, Gilbert was ranked among the top players in his class and committed to Louisiana State University (LSU) to play college football.

College career

LSU

Georgia

Nebraska

References

External links

Georgia Bulldogs bio
LSU Tigers bio

2002 births
Living people
Players of American football from Marietta, Georgia
American football tight ends
LSU Tigers football players
Georgia Bulldogs football players